Niemen (also known as "Człowiek jam niewdzięczny" - "Ungrateful Man I Am" or "Czerwony Album" - "The Red Album") is double LP album by Czesław Niemen released in 1971. It was another step towards Niemen's embrace of progressive rock and avantgarde music.

Track listing 
 "Człowiek jam niewdzięczny" - 20:32 (lyrics Czesław Niemen)
 "Aerumnarum Plenus" - 7:35 (lyrics Cyprian Kamil Norwid)
 "Italiam, Italiam" - 4:58 (lyrics Cyprian Kamil Norwid)
 "Enigmatyczne impresje" - 7:27 (instrumental)
 "Nie jesteś moja" - 8:15 (lyrics Czesław Niemen)
 "Wróć jeszcze dziś" - 3:47 (lyrics Wojciech Młynarski)
 "Mój pejzaż" - 5:13 (lyrics Marta Bellan)
 "Sprzedaj mnie wiatrowi" - 4:27 (lyrics Ryszard Marek Groński)
 "Zechcesz mnie, zechcesz" - 3:34 (lyrics Wojciech Młynarski)
 "Chwila ciszy" - 5:01 (lyrics Wojciech Młynarski)
 "Muzyko moja" - 3:54 (lyrics Wojciech Młynarski)

Personnel 
Jacek Mikuła - Hammond organ
Tomasz Jaśkiewicz - guitar
Janusz Zieliński - bass
Czesław Bartkowski - drums
Zbigniew Namysłowski - alto saxophone
Janusz Stefański - percussion
Czesław Niemen - vocal, flute
Krystyna Prońko, Zofia Borca, Elżbieta Linkowska - background vocals
Partita - background vocals

References

Czesław Niemen albums
1971 albums
Polskie Nagrania Muza albums